Rasnik is a village in southern Bulgaria. The village is located in Pernik Municipality, Pernik Province. Аccording to the numbers provided by the 2020 Bulgarian census, Rasnik currently has a population of 399 people with a permanent address registration in the settlement.

Geography 
Rasnik village is located in Municipality Pernik, 15 kilometers away west from Pernik and 40 kilometers away from Sofia, the capital of Bulgaria. The neighboring villages are Meshtitsa and Viskyar.

Rasnik village is located between the plain Bazglav and Viskyar mountain, at an average elevation of 782 meters.

History 
Near the village, the remains of an ancient settlement have been found. The first written data confirming the existence of Rasnik dates back to the 16th century.

There are remains of an ancient Roman road near the village. According to local non-confirmed legends, the village was first established in 1306. It used to be in another area but later moved to its current location.

The name Rasnik stems from the fact that once in the area of the village the verdure was thriving. Rasnik translates into growth from Bulgarian language.

Ethnicity 
According to the Bulgarian population census in 2011.

References 

Villages in Pernik Province